Randolph family may refer to:

 Randolph family of Virginia
 An alternative title for the 1943 British film Dear Octopus